Russell James Vitale better known as Russ (born September 26, 1992) is an American rapper, singer, and songwriter. After years of releasing albums, mixtapes and singles for free online, Russ released his twelfth studio album, There's Really a Wolf, in May 2017 with Columbia Records; it was certified Platinum in April 2018. His first hit singles came from the album and were:  "What They Want", "Losin Control" and "Best on Earth" (featuring Bia), peaking respectively at number 83, 63, and 46 on the US Billboard Hot 100. His thirteenth album, Zoo, was released on September 7, 2018, and peaked at number 4 on the US Billboard 200. His fourteenth studio album, Shake the Snow Globe, was released on January 31, 2020, also peaking at number 4 on the US Billboard 200. Outside of his solo music, he is part of Diemon, a music collective from Atlanta.

Early life 
Russ was born on September 26, 1992, in Secaucus, New Jersey. He is of Sicilian descent. Russ was born into a Sicilian-American family which included him and three other siblings. He lived in North Carolina and Kentucky in his childhood due to his father having to constantly relocate due to his career, before his family found a permanent home in Atlanta. Russ was taught to play guitar by his father, and over the years gradually learned how to play several instruments. He started writing raps in his notebook at 7 years old. He started making beats when he was 14, and was initially producing with his friend Bugus. He recorded his first song at 18 years old.

Career 
In 2011, Russ, alongside friend and fellow rapper Bugus, appeared on MTV after Bugus' song "El Jefe" gained traction. After his short enrollment in Kennesaw State University, Russ co-founded his own collective and label, Diemon, with Bugus and others. In a 2012 article on Jenesis Magazine, Russ was described as an in-house producer for Diemon.

From December 2011 to August 2014, Russ released 11 albums and 87 singles consecutively; all free of charge. Despite this, his music had not gained the attention that he wanted, so he began to release a song every week on SoundCloud for almost three years.  Two of these songs, "What They Want" and "Losin Control", eventually peaked at number 83 and number 62 on the US Billboard Hot 100 respectively.

After signing a partnership with Columbia Records, Russ released his twelfth studio album, There's Really a Wolf, on May 5, 2017; it debuted at number 7 on the US Billboard 200 and number four on the US Top R&B/Hip-Hop Albums charts. On April 18, 2018, the album was certified platinum by the Recording Industry Association of America (RIAA) for combined sales and album-equivalent units of over 1,000,000 units in the United States. Prior to releasing his album, Russ announced on his Twitter account that he would be headlining his tour, The Wake Up Tour, from May 16 to August 5, 2017.

Russ released his thirteenth studio album, Zoo, on September 7, 2018, which peaked at number 4 on the Billboard 200. On November 12, 2019, Russ published his first book, It's All in Your Head. On January 31, 2020, he released his fourteenth studio album, Shake the Snow Globe, on Russ My Way Inc/Columbia Records. It peaked at number 4 on the US Billboard 200.

On June 30, 2020, Russ announced that he completed his deal with Columbia Records and is now an independent artist. On November 17, 2020, he released an EP titled Chomp. It features guest appearances from Black Thought, Busta Rhymes, Benny the Butcher and Ab-Soul, among others.

On November 18, 2021, Russ announced a new EP, Chomp 2, as the sequel to last year’s Chomp. The project was released on December 8, 2021 under Russ My Way Inc.

Musical style and influences 
Russ's early inspirations were G-Unit, 50 Cent and Eminem.
He produced beats for around six years before he attempted to record himself rapping. Russ is known for his songs being produced, mixed, mastered, engineered, written, and performed by himself. Most of his songs contain hip hop and R&B elements, while combining rapping and singing on the hook. His style has been described by Uproxx as a "raspy, hardbody rap flow, and lilting, almost drunken singing voice".

Controversy 
On September 11, 2017, after a show, Russ tweeted a picture depicting him in a shirt with writing on it that said: "How much xans and lean do you have to do before you realize you're a fucking loser". The tweet caused controversy, and led to numerous responses from other music artists. Chicago rapper Fredo Santana responded to the tweet, stating: "Until I can stop thinking bout my dead homies an the trauma I been thru in my life that's when I'll stop".

Following the controversy, the phrase "fuck Russ" became a commonly referenced phrase and meme. On June 6, 2018, after rappers Lil Pump and J. Cole settled their issues in an interview, Lil Pump tweeted "ME & J COLE COOL NOW SO NOW ITS FUCK RUSS".

Personal life 
Russ has two different eye colors, a condition known as heterochromia; his left eye is dark-brown and his right is light-brown.

Discography 

 There's Really a Wolf (2017)
 Zoo (2018)
 Shake the Snow Globe (2020)
 Chomp 2 (2021)

Awards and nominations

References

External links 

Interview with Artistic Manifesto 2014
Video of Russ signing with Columbia Records

Living people
1992 births
American male rappers
Rappers from Atlanta
American hip hop record producers
American people of Italian descent
People of Sicilian descent
Southern hip hop musicians
American hip hop singers
Songwriters from Georgia (U.S. state)
21st-century American rappers
21st-century American male musicians
Columbia Records artists
American male songwriters
Indie rappers
People from Secaucus, New Jersey
American contemporary R&B singers
Alternative hip hop musicians
Singers from New Jersey
Rappers from New Jersey
Songwriters from New Jersey
Singers from Georgia (U.S. state)